Muliza is a traditional music and dance style from Cerro de Pasco, Pasco region, Peru. Other sources mention that it was originated in Tarma, Junín region, disputing both cities the origin of the dance. Popularized at the end of the 19th century, on February 3, 2014 it was declared a national cultural heritage.

History 
It was born in the 18th century during the Viceroyalty of Peru. The Spanish crown made use of the mines in Pasco, making mining one of the pillars of the colonial economy, determining economical, social and political change.

It seems that their origin can be found in the mining business and the transport of minerals from Cerro de Pasco to the Argentinian ports. This function was carried out by muleteers, who transported the minerals by mule. The name of the dance was derived from this line of work.

Says Rolando Casquero Alcántara:

Similarly, Dionicio Rodolfo Bernal affirms that

Currently, muliza is linked to Carnival.

References 

Peruvian folk music
Pasco Region
Peruvian dances